Zebina maxima is a species of minute sea snail, a marine gastropod mollusk or micromollusk in the family Zebinidae.

Description
The height of the shell attains 14 mm.

Distribution
This species occurs in the Indian Ocean off Madagascar.

References

 Bozzetti L. (2007) Zebina (Tomlinella) maxima nuova specie (Gastropoda: Hypsogastropoda: Rissoidae) dal Madagascar Meridionale. Malacologia Mostra Mondiale 54: 8-9.

External links
 

maxima
Gastropods described in 2007